"What Goes Around" may refer to:

"What Goes Around", a song by Ringo Starr from his 1992 album Time Takes Time
 What Goes Around (Dave Holland album), 2002
 What Goes Around (Statik Selektah album), 2014
 What Goes Around..., a 1983 album by The Hollies
 What Goes Around - Greatest & Latest, a 1995 album by Suzi Quatro
 What Goes Around Comes Around, a 1975 album by Waylon Jennings
 What Goes Around Comes around, a 1989 song by Joe Raposo from the Shining Time Station episode Just Wild About Harry's Workshop
 "What Goes Around... Comes Around", a 2006 song by Justin Timberlake